Comfort to Me is the second studio album by Australian pub rock and punk band Amyl and the Sniffers. It was released on 10 September 2021 by B2B Records in Australia, Rough Trade Records in Europe and ATO Records in North America.

The album reached No. 2 in Australia and No. 21 on the UK Albums Chart.

At the J Awards of 2021, the album was nominated for Australian Album of the Year.

At the AIR Awards of 2022, the album was nominated for Independent Album of the Year and won Best Independent Punk Album or EP.

At the 2022 ARIA Music Awards, the album was nominated for Album of the Year, Best Group and Best Rock Album.

Track listing

Charts

References

2021 albums
Amyl and the Sniffers albums
ARIA Award-winning albums
Flightless (record label) albums
Rough Trade Records albums